MIRACL (formerly known as CertiVox) is a London-based web 2.0 security firm that develops information security infrastructure as a service (IaaS) and encryption based software as a service (SaaS) solutions for enterprises and individuals.  The company provides on-demand encryption key management and multi-factor authentication both on and off the cloud, and specializes in elliptical curve cryptography. Red Herring selected MIRACL as a finalist for the 2012 Europe Top 100.

History 
Brian Spector founded CertiVox. The company opened its offices in Shoreditch in 2011.

The company partnered with low-power customer specific standard product (CSSP) provider QuickLogic in February 2012, in efforts to jointly develop data security solutions across platforms. Also in February, the company acquired Shamus Software, the creator of the MIRACL cryptographic library.

In 2011, CertiVox received $1.46 million in Series A funding led by Pentech Ventures and Octopus Investments.

In 2012 it launched a service called PrivateSky allowing users to encrypt messages and large files up to 5GB. Its design offered Government, businesses, and individuals one-click security in Microsoft Outlook. and HTML5 web browsers. However PrivateSky was taken offline by the company following a RIPA warrant from GCHQ's National Technical Assistance Centre (NTAC) who wanted decryption keys for customer data.

CertiVox launched its M-Pin Strong Authentication System in July 2013.

In January 2016, the company changed its name to MIRACL. The name is an acronym for Multiprecision Integer and Rational Arithmetic Cryptographic Library, which was created at Dublin City University School of Computing in 1988 and which the company acquired with its purchase of Shamus Software in 2012. The reason given for the name change was to reflect “a pivot in our mission and business, from providing individual products to offering complete solutions that have the potential to transform an industry”.

References 

Computer security software companies
Software companies of the United Kingdom